Goregaon is a town and a Tehsil in Gondia subdivision of Gondia district in Nagpur Division(Berar region) in the state of Maharashtra, India.

References

Cities and towns in Gondia district
Talukas in Maharashtra